A place of authentication was a characteristic institution of medieval Hungarian law. Places of authentication were cathedral chapters and monasteries authorized to provide notarial services, including the issuing of authentic copies of documents.

References

Sources 

 
 
 
 
 
 
 

Legal history of Hungary
Medieval Kingdom of Hungary
Catholic Church in Hungary
KOSZTA, LÁSZLÓ: Conclusions Drawn from the Prosopographic Analysis of the Canons Belonging to the Cathedral Chapters of Medieval Hungary (1200—1350), in: Universidade, Catâolica Portuguesa Carreiras Eclesiásticas no Ocidente Cristão (séc. XII–XIV) – Ecclesiastical Careers in Western Christianity (12th–14th c.), Lisboa 2007. S. 15–28.